United Nations Security Council resolution 498, adopted on 18 December 1981, after recalling resolutions 425 (1978), 426 (1978), 427 (1978), 434 (1978), 444 (1979), 450 (1979), 459 (1979), 467 (1980), 474 (1980), 483 (1980) and 490 (1981), considering the report from the secretary-general on the United Nations Interim Force in Lebanon (UNIFIL), the council noted the continuing need for the Force given the situation between Israel and Lebanon.

The resolution went on to extend the mandate of UNIFIL until 19 June 1982, commending the work the Force had done in the area. It reiterated its support for development efforts in Lebanon and requested help to the Government of Lebanon.

Resolution 498 was adopted by 13 votes to none, while East Germany and the Soviet Union abstained.

See also
 Blue Line
 Israeli–Lebanese conflict
 List of United Nations Security Council Resolutions 401 to 500 (1976–1982)

References
Text of the Resolution at undocs.org

External links
 

 0498
Israeli–Lebanese conflict
 0498
1981 in Israel
 0498
December 1981 events